The UN/LOCODEs for Argentina start with AR, the ISO 3166-1 alpha-2 code for that country.

In edition 2006-1 24 codes were added. In edition 2007 3 codes were added.

See also
ISO 3166-2:AR

External links
http://unece.org/cefact/locode/ar.htm

AR